Bird is the 2015 album by singer-songwriter Lisbeth Scott.  The album includes three new recordings of songs that had been previously used in films: "Good To Me" (Shutter), "Wonderful Life" (The Big Wedding), and "Just Like Rain" (The Boy Next Door).

Track listing

Credits
Musicians
Lisbeth Scott - vocals, guitar, piano, bass, percussion, ukulele
Nathan Barr - guitars on track 2, 11; mandolin on track 7
Butch Norton - drums on tracks 1, 3, 5, 6
Greg Leisz - pedal steel on tracks 1, 3
Dan Lutz - bass on tracks 1-3, 5, 6
Phil Parlapiano - mandolin on tracks 1, 3
Quinn - drums on tracks 2, 4, 7, 11
Tina Guo - cello on track 4
John Huldt - guitars on tracks 5-9
Matthias Weber - organ maestro on track 7
Abra Moore - featured vocals on track 9
Coyote String Quartet - strings on track 10
Joel Douek - string arrangement on track 10
Ian Walker - bass on track 11
Adi Ovarsson - accordion on track 11
Joseph Trapanese - orchestration on track 11
Steve Erdody, Julie Gigante, Natalie Leggett, Brian Dembow - string quartet on track 11
Adam Moseley - drum programming on track 7,9

Production
Lisbeth Scott - producer, engineer
Daniel Lerner - mixer on tracks 1-8, 10; engineer on tracks 2, 8, 10
Adam Moseley - mixer on tracks 9, 11
Jun Murakawa - engineer on tracks 1, 5, 7
Jimmy Fahey - engineer on tracks 2, 3
Quinn - engineer on tracks 4
Dave Bianco - engineer on tracks 5
Steve Lukach - engineer on tracks 7
Nathan Barr - engineer on tracks 11

References

External links

2015 albums